In 2014, Kent County Cricket Club competed in Division Two of the County Championship, Group B of the 50-over Royal London One-Day Cup and the South Group of the NatWest t20 Blast. Kent also hosted a first-class match at the St Lawrence Ground against Loughborough MCCU at the start of the season. It was the third season in charge for head coach Jimmy Adams. The club captain was former England batsmen Rob Key, who resumed the captaincy after James Tredwell had spent one season in the role. Australia bowler Doug Bollinger signed for the club for the 2014 season. Other new additions to the squad included fast bowlers Mitchell Claydon – who had a load spell with Kent in 2013 – from Durham, David Griffiths from Hampshire and former Kent player Robbie Joseph.

With young off-spinner Adam Riley getting an extended  run in the side, James Tredwell signed a short-term loan deal with Sussex in order to play first-class cricket in Division One of the County Championship. He continued to play List A and T20 cricket for Kent during this time.

Kent had a slightly better season than in 2013, but remained struggling in mid-table of the County Championship Division Two and again made little impact in the NatWest t20 Blast. They did however reach the semi-finals of the Royal London One-Day Cup, where they were beaten by Warwickshire.

Bowler Mark Davies was forced to retire from playing in September after failing to recover from a shoulder injury. At the end of the season, and having lost his place in the first team to Sam Billings, former England wicket-keeper Geraint Jones left the county to join Gloucestershire as four-day captain after 15 seasons with Kent.

James Tredwell continued to earn international recognition for England in 2014, taking 23 wickets in 20 One Day Internationals (taking his total to 59 wickets in 44 ODIs) and 4 wickets in 10 T20 Internationals (for a career total of 7 wickets in 17 T20Is). Tredwell featured in all of England's matches at the 2014 World Twenty20.

Squad
 No. denotes the player's squad number, as worn on the back of their shirt.
 Ages given as of the first day of the County Championship season, 6 April 2014.

County Championship

Division Two

Matches

Other first-class match

MCCU Matches

Royal London One-Day Cup

Group B

Matches

Quarter-finals

Semi-finals

Other List A Matches

Tour Matches
2014 Sri Lanka tour of England

NatWest t20 Blast

South Group

Matches

Statistics

Batting

Bowling

References

External links
Kent home at ESPN cricinfo
Kent County Cricket Club official site

2014
2014 in English cricket